Mordechai Virshuvski (10 May 1930 – 1 May 2012) was an Israeli politician who served as a member of the Knesset (and as Deputy Speaker) for several parties between 1977 and 1992.

Biography
Born in Leipzig in Germany, Virshubski made aliyah to Mandatory Palestine in 1939. He attended the Herzliya Hebrew High School in Tel Aviv, before going on to study law at the Hebrew University of Jerusalem, later being certified as a lawyer. From 1955 until 1966 he worked as a legal advisor to Mekorot, before becoming Tel Aviv City Council's legal advisor, a job he held until 1977.

In 1974 he was amongst the founders of Shinui, and was elected to the Knesset on the Democratic Movement for Change list (which Shinui was part of) in 1977. When the party split the following year, he stayed with the Shinui faction. He was re-elected in 1981 and 1984. On 5 August 1987 he left Shinui to join Ratz, and was re-elected on the Ratz list in 1988, after which he became a Deputy Speaker. He was a candidate in the 1989 Tel Aviv mayoral election, but finished fourth with 5.7% of the vote. He lost his Knesset seat in the 1992 elections, shortly after Ratz had formed the Meretz alliance with Shinui and Mapam. He ran for the Tel Aviv mayoralty again in 1993, but finished fourth with 3.6% of the vote. He subsequently served on Tel Aviv City Council as a member of Ratz and later of the Greens.

Virshubski was married to Viola (née Israel), and together they have two children and five grandchildren.

References

External links

1930 births
2012 deaths
Jewish emigrants from Nazi Germany to Mandatory Palestine
Herzliya Hebrew Gymnasium alumni
Hebrew University of Jerusalem Faculty of Law alumni
Israeli lawyers
Israeli civil servants
Meretz politicians
Ratz (political party) politicians
Shinui politicians
Democratic Movement for Change politicians
Members of the 9th Knesset (1977–1981)
Members of the 10th Knesset (1981–1984)
Members of the 11th Knesset (1984–1988)
Members of the 12th Knesset (1988–1992)
Deputy Speakers of the Knesset
Burials at Yarkon Cemetery